Cheppindi Chestha is a 1978 Indian Telugu-language action film starring Krishna Ghattamaneni, Jayachitra, Narasimharaju, Kavitha and M. Prabhakar Reddy. The film had musical score by Chellapilla Satyam. The film was written and directed by M. S. Gopinath.

Plot

Cast

Music 

The soundtrack album comprised 6 tracks composed by Chellapilla Satyam.

Tracks 
 "Happy Birthday" — S. P. Balasubrahmanyam, P. Susheela
 "Chinna Daani" — S. P. B., Vijayalakshmi Sharma
 "Koti Oohala" — S. P. B., P. Susheela
 "Aadaala Padaala" — P. Susheela, Vijayalakshmi Sharma
 "Okaanokka Kanne" — S. P. B
 "Kanne Pillalam" — P. Susheela, Vijayalakshmi Sharma

Release and reception 
The film was released on 31 September 1978 was certified with a U certificate from the regional office of censor board at Hyderabad with the certificate dated 15 September 1978.

References

External links 
 

1978 films
1970s Telugu-language films